Isiah Whitlock Jr. (born September 13, 1954) is an American actor. He is best known for his role as corrupt state senator Clay Davis on the HBO television series The Wire as well as being a frequent collaborator of Spike Lee.

He has also appeared in films including Goodfellas, Pieces of April, 1408, Enchanted, Cedar Rapids, Pete’s Dragon, Cars 3, The Old Man and the Gun, All Square, I Care a Lot, and Lightyear and television series including The Good Cop, Veep, Chappelle's Show, Your Honor, and several roles across installments of the Law & Order franchise.

Early life
Whitlock was born in South Bend, Indiana. He attended college at Southwest Minnesota State University in Marshall, Minnesota, where he enrolled through a football scholarship and studied theater. Injuries led him to stop playing football and focus on acting. After graduating in 1976, he moved to San Francisco and joined the American Conservatory Theater.

Career
Whitlock is best known for his role on the HBO television series The Wire as corrupt state senator Clay Davis. He has also appeared in the Spike Lee films She Hate Me, 25th Hour, Red Hook Summer, Chi-Raq, BlacKkKlansman and Da 5 Bloods. In those projects, Whitlock established a catchphrase from his character's distinct pronunciation of the word "shit" ("sheeeeeeeee-it"). Whitlock also made appearances on Chappelle's Show and has made several appearances as various characters on Law & Order. He appeared as Eugene, a supporting role, in the 2003 film Pieces of April. He had a bit part in Goodfellas as a doctor who gives Henry Hill Valium while attending to his brother. He also made an appearance in the film 1408, as the engineer of the Dolphin Hotel, as well as appearing in promotional spots for the Wii video game Punch-Out!! portraying the character Doc Louis. In 2007, he played Ethan Banks in Enchanted.

Whitlock played an insurance agent named Ronald Wilkes in the 2011 film Cedar Rapids. Wilkes is a self-described fan of The Wire and does an impersonation of character Omar Little. Whitlock has said that the references to the series were written in before he became involved in Cedar Rapids. Whitlock filmed a separate promotion for the film, where Wilkes is seen in an insurance office reading lines from The Wire. He recurred on the HBO comedy series Veep as General George Maddox. Whitlock has also made appearances on The Good Wife, Louie, Gotham, The Carmichael Show, and Elementary. He recently appeared as the sheriff in the 2016 remake of the 1977 film of Pete's Dragon.

SMSU now offers the Isiah Whitlock Jr. Endowed Scholarship. He was SMSU's commencement speaker in 1999 and guest artist for the school's celebration of Black History Month in 2007.

Capitalizing on his catch phrase "Sheeeeeeeee-it" and his public notoriety, Whitlock launched a successful Kickstarter Talking Bobblehead campaign. The campaign has raised over $100,000 from 1,828 backers.

Filmography

Film

Television

Video games

References

External links

Isiah Whitlock Jr. at the Internet Off-Broadway Database

1954 births
African-American male actors
American male film actors
American male stage actors
American male television actors
American male voice actors
Living people
Actors from South Bend, Indiana
Southwest Minnesota State University alumni
Male actors from Indiana
20th-century American male actors
21st-century American male actors
20th-century African-American people
21st-century African-American people